Planet America is an Australian television news program on ABC News. The program is co-hosted by John Barron and Chas Licciardello, and premiered on 10 February 2012. The program was launched to cover American political news events ahead of the 2012 presidential election.

The program continued airing weekly after the 2012 election, covering the week's news in American politics.

In 2017, the Planet Extra series was created, with episodes uploaded to Planet America's Facebook page. In 2018, Planet America's time slot was increased to 45 minutes.

In 2020, the program was moved to the prime time slot of 9.30pm on Wednesdays on the primary ABC TV channel with a half-hour runtime. Planet America's Fireside Chat, a spin-off show, premiered on 31 January 2020 on ABC News on Fridays at 8pm with a 45-minute time slot. The Planet Extra Podcast started on 14 February 2020, hosted by Chas Licciardello and Dr. David Smith.

In 2021, the main show was moved to Fireside Chat’s timeslot, and extended to run for just under an hour. It started at 7:03pm (after ABC News Update) and consisted of four sections: a general American news section, an interview with a guest, a report by John Barron, and the Fireside Chat. Barron's reports, as well as extended versions of multiple interviews, would generally be available on ABC iview and the "ABC News In-Depth" YouTube channel individually (i.e. separate from the main show), as well as being included in the full broadcast. Towards the end of the season, with no more guests to be interviewed, Barron was joined by Gavin Wood to present Countdown-style rankings of the best and worst Presidents of the United States.

Other programs similar to Planet America have been created out of its popularity, such as China Tonight (from 2021; with Stan Grant and Yvonne Yong) and India Now (from 2022; with Marc Fennell).

John Barron confirmed on Twitter that the 2022 season of Planet America will begin on September 26th, delayed by the funeral of Queen Elizabeth II. It was due to begin sometime in August, for the 2022 US midterm elections, but was later pushed back to September. In the meantime, the co-hosts have been working on other projects for the ABC, such as The Context with John Barron: a news analysis show during (what would have been) Planet America’s timeslot hosted by Barron, starting from June. There was also a Planet America Special that aired on July 22nd after The Context for the Capitol Riot hearings.

Episodes

Planet America

Planet America's Fireside Chat

Planet Extra

Planet Extra Podcast

References

External links
 

Australian Broadcasting Corporation original programming
ABC News and Current Affairs
Australian television news shows
2012 Australian television series debuts
English-language television shows